KQFX-LD (channel 22), branded on-air as Fox 22, is a low-power television station licensed to Columbia, Missouri, United States, serving as the Fox affiliate for the Columbia–Jefferson City market. It is owned by the News-Press & Gazette Company (NPG) alongside dual ABC/MyNetworkTV affiliate KMIZ (channel 17, also licensed to Columbia). Both stations share studios on the East Business Loop 70 in Columbia, while KQFX-LD's transmitter is located west of Jamestown near the Moniteau–Cooper county line. 

In addition to its own digital signal, KQFX-LD is simulcast in high definition on KMIZ's fourth digital subchannel (17.4) from the same transmitter site.

History
The low-power station went on the air in 1991 as K11TB. It became a Fox affiliate in 1997. In October 2003, the station moved to channel 38 (as K38II) and increased its power to cover both Columbia and Jefferson City from its tower site near Ashland. During its Fox era, it used "KQFX" (then a fake call sign) as part of its brand identity. K38II remained on the air until June 12, 2009, when the license for sister station KZOU-LP became KQFX-LD on digital channel 22 and took the Fox programs. This was the only new television broadcast in Mid-Missouri when the "digital transition" occurred. Fox 22 now reaches the vast majority of Mid-Missouri homes with a digital antenna and is available on all cable and satellite systems in Mid-Missouri.

Before June 14, 2009, this license was called KZOU-LP and carried UPN programs (and later MyNetworkTV as "My Zou 32"). K38II picked up the call letters shortly after KZOU came KQFX-LD. K38II became KZOU-LP on June 22, 2009, to keep the call letters. On September 3, 2010, the FCC canceled KZOU-LP's license.

On July 26, 2012, JW announced that KQFX and its sister stations were sold to News-Press & Gazette Company for $16 Million. The sale was consummated on November 1.

Programming

Syndicated programming
Syndicated programming on KQFX includes Family Feud, The People's Court, Modern Family, and The Big Bang Theory.

News operation
With the debut of its high definition newscasts and the market's only 6:30 p.m. newscast, KMIZ began offering five hours of local news every weekday. It broadcasts an hour-long newscast on KQFX on weekdays and a 30-minute newscast on Saturdays and Sundays. On September 2, 2013, KMIZ added weekday newscasts at 9 a.m. and noon.

Subchannels
The station's digital signal is multiplexed:

References

External links

Fox network affiliates
News-Press & Gazette Company
QFX-LD
Low-power television stations in the United States
Television channels and stations established in 2004
2004 establishments in Missouri